Finis Dean Smith (born January 15, 1932) is an American former track and field athlete and stuntman, and winner of the gold medal in the 4 × 100 m relay at the 1952 Summer Olympics.

Born in Breckenridge, Texas, Smith won the Amateur Athletic Union championships in 100 m in 1952. At the Helsinki Olympics, he was fourth in the 100 m and ran the leadoff leg for American gold medal winning 4 × 100 m relay team.  As a sprinter on the Longhorn track team, Smith ran a 100-yard dash in 9.4 seconds, one tenth of a second off the world record at the time.

After graduating from University of Texas at Austin where he ran track and was a member of the Silver Spurs, Smith played professional football for the Los Angeles Rams and the Pittsburgh Steelers, but never played in a regular season game. After his sports career, Smith performed as a professional rodeo cowboy and stuntman in various Western movies such as The Alamo, The Comancheros, How The West Was Won, McLintock!, Rio Conchos, Big Jake, El Dorado, and Rio Lobo. He also appeared in such Western TV shows as Tales of Wells Fargo, Maverick, Gunsmoke, Lawman, Have Gun Will Travel, The Iron Horse and Walker, Texas Ranger.

Smith competed in amateur rodeo. His events were bareback bronc riding and calf roping. He won championships in both events. The Professional Rodeo Cowboys Associations made him an honorary member. He also participated in Reba McEntire's Pro Celebrity Rodeo in May 1997 in the team roping event.

In 2006 he was inducted into the Texas Rodeo Cowboy Hall of Fame. In 2009 he was inducted into the National Multicultural Western Heritage Museum and Hall of Fame. He is also a member of the Texas Track and Field Coaches Association Hall of Fame. Smith is a member of the Hollywood Stuntman's Hall of Fame. In 1997 he was named "All American Cowboy" and in 1998 he received a Golden Boot Award. In 2007 he received the Silver Spur award for his contributions as a stuntman in the film business.

Competition record

References

External links
 

1932 births
Living people
People from Breckenridge, Texas
Track and field athletes from Texas
American male sprinters
American stunt performers
Athletes (track and field) at the 1952 Summer Olympics
Athletes (track and field) at the 1955 Pan American Games
Olympic gold medalists for the United States in track and field
Medalists at the 1952 Summer Olympics
Bareback bronc riders
Roping (rodeo)
USA Outdoor Track and Field Championships winners
Pan American Games track and field athletes for the United States